The Car is a 1977 American horror film directed by Elliot Silverstein and written by Michael Butler, Dennis Shryack and Lane Slate. The film stars James Brolin, Kathleen Lloyd, John Marley and Ronny Cox, along with real-life sisters Kim and Kyle Richards (as Brolin's daughters). It tells the story of a black unmanned self-driving mysterious car that goes on a murderous rampage, terrorizing the residents of a small town.

The film was produced and distributed by Universal Pictures, and was influenced by numerous "road movies" of the 1970s including Steven Spielberg's thriller Duel (1971) and Roger Corman's Death Race 2000 (1975). A spinoff sequel, The Car: Road to Revenge, was released on January 8, 2019, with Ronny Cox returning in the series.

Plot
Two cyclists riding through a canyon are followed by a mysterious matte black car down the road. At a bridge, the car proceeds to crush one cyclist against the wall and ram the other from behind, catapulting him off the bridge. A hitchhiker, hoping to get a ride, encounters the car and insults it after it purposely tries to run him down. It halts to a stop, reverses backwards, and runs him over several times before driving off. The local sheriff's office, called to a series of hit and runs, gets a lead on the car. It appears to be heavily customized and has no license plates, as pointed out by Amos Clemens (R. G. Armstrong) after he saw it run over the hitchhiker.

That night, in an apparent bid to kill Amos, the car instead runs over Sheriff Everett Peck (John Marley), leaving Chief Deputy Wade Parent (James Brolin) in charge. During the resulting investigation, an eyewitness to the accident states there was no driver, furthering Wade's confusion. Wade asks his girlfriend, Lauren (Kathleen Lloyd), a teacher at the local school, to cancel the upcoming marching band rehearsals for their safety. Lauren and her friend, the wife of Wade's deputy Luke Johnson (Ronny Cox), ask him to let them rehearse. Luke unwittingly agrees.

The car enters the town and attacks the school marching band as it rehearses at the local showground. It chases the group of teachers and students into a cemetery. Curiously enough, the vehicle will not enter onto the consecrated ground. Lauren taunts the driver, which no one among the townsfolk have yet seen. Seemingly angered, the car destroys a brick gate post and leaves. The police go on a high-speed chase along highways throughout the desert before the car turns on them, destroying several squad cars and killing five of Wade's deputies. None of Wade's bullets put a dent on the car's windshield or tires, much to his surprise. After trying unsuccessfully to get inside the vehicle when it stops (the car has no door handles), Wade is knocked out when the door opens by itself. The car escapes. At the hospital, Wade is consoled by his remaining deputies and Lauren. He later offers to get her some spare clean clothes.

That evening, Lauren is at her home, talking to Wade over the phone, when the enraged car drives straight through her house, killing her. Luke explains for a grief-stricken Wade killing his girlfriend was an act of revenge for Lauren's insults and notes it apparently did not enter the cemetery because "the ground is hallowed," a biblical reference. Wade concocts a plan to destroy the car in a controlled explosion within canyons that lie outside of town. After discovering it waiting in his own garage, they are forced to carry out his plans with great haste. Wade is pursued by the car into a mountainous canyon area where his remaining deputies have set a trap.

In a final confrontation, Wade and Luke stand at the edge of a cliff and bait the car into running straight at them. They jump aside as it goes over the cliff into the dynamite, causing an explosion.  A monstrous, demonic visage appears inside the flames, to everyone's shock. Wade refuses to believe what the group saw in the flames despite Luke's insistence.

The film concludes with the car prowling the streets of downtown Los Angeles, apparently having survived the crash.

Cast

 James Brolin as Captain Wade Parent
 Kathleen Lloyd as Lauren Humphries
 John Marley as Sheriff Everett Peck
 Elizabeth Thompson as Margie Johnson
 Ronny Cox as Deputy Luke Johnson
 R. G. Armstrong as Amos Clemens
 John Rubinstein as John Morris
 Kim Richards as Lynn Marie Parent
 Kyle Richards as Debbie Parent
 Roy Jenson as Ray Mott
 Kate Murtagh as Miss McDonald
 Doris Dowling as Bertha Clemens
 Eddie Little Sky as Denson
 Lee McLaughlin as Marvin Fats
 Melody Thomas Scott as Suzie Pullbrook
 Geraldine Keams as Donna

Production
The evil, black car in the film was a highly customized 1971 Lincoln Continental Mark III designed by famed Hollywood car customizer George Barris. There were four cars built for the film in six weeks. Three were used as stunt mules, the fourth for closeups. The stunt mules were destroyed during production, while the fourth is now in a private collection.

The car's bodywork was painted in steel, pearl and charcoal coloring. The windows were laminated in two different shades, smoked on the inside and amber on the outside, so one could see out of it but not into it.
In order to give "the car" a "sinister" look as requested by director Elliot Silverstein, Barris made the car's roof three inches lower than usual and altered its side fenders that same length again both higher and longer.
According to Silverstein, the distinctive sound the horn of The Car makes spells out the letter X in Morse code.

Parts of the film were shot in St. George, Hurricane-LaVerkin Bridge, Zion, Kanab, Crazy Horse Canyon and Glen Canyon in Utah.

The late Church of Satan leader Anton LaVey was given a "Technical Adviser" credit on the film. His quote, "Oh great brothers of the night who rideth upon the hot winds of hell, who dwelleth in the Devil's lair; move and appear", is given in the opening credits and is taken from the "Invocation of Destruction" in The Satanic Bible.

The film's main theme, heard predominantly throughout, is a reworked, orchestral version of the Dies Irae. The theme was intentionally made to resemble more Berlioz's 5th part of Symphonie fantastique (itself also inspired by Dies Irae) rather than Dies Irae as it was found to have a more sinister tone than its original counterpart. Moreover, a derivative of the music was also used in the 1991 film Sleeping With The Enemy.

Reception and home media
The film was panned by critics, citing poor dialogue and acting. The film holds a 28% approval rating from Rotten Tomatoes based on 18 reviews.

Vincent Canby of The New York Times wrote that the film "has all the ingredients of a parody, although someone has made the mistake of doing it straight." Chicago Tribune film critic Gene Siskel gave the film one star out of four and wrote, "What's worse than the rotten acting is that 'The Car' makes absolutely no sense as a story. In some scenes the car is presented as a supernatural being, able to materialize at will. In other scenes however, the car is hopelessly realistic. Even more surprising is the poor quality of the film's special effects." 
Arthur D. Murphy of Variety wrote, " 'The Car' is a total wreck. Story concerns a phantom auto on a killing spree (allegory, anyone?) in a small western town where everybody overacts badly." Kevin Thomas of the Los Angeles Times wrote that the film's "various special effects are superior," but stated, "With often laughable dialogue—some of it deleted after previews—the film's appeal is limited to the undiscriminating seeking a new sensation." Gary Arnold of The Washington Post called it "a blatant, pitiful attempt to recycle elements from superior scare vehicles," namely Duel and Jaws. John Gillett of The Monthly Film Bulletin stated that the film "manages to be a fairly brisk thriller" when the action was focused on the car, but lamented that director Silverstein "has been saddled with one of those small-town family scripts complete with Deputy Sheriff romping with his schoolteacher friend, a drink-and-neurosis-ridden police force, and some generally strained acting by a less than starry cast."

The film is listed in Golden Raspberry Award founder John Wilson's book The Official Razzie Movie Guide as one of the 100 Most Enjoyably Bad Movies Ever Made.

The Car was released in standard definition and without additional features on VHS and DVD by Anchor Bay Entertainment on July 20, 1999. Arrow Films released The Car on Blu-ray on December 15, 2015. The Blu-ray release features the first HD 1080p transfer of the film, as well as commentary and additional features.

Spinoff 

In 2019, 42 years after the original film, a spinoff sequel (also starring Ronny Cox, but as a different character) was released called The Car: Road to Revenge to negative reviews by audiences and critics alike.

See also
Similar titles
 Killdozer!, a 1974 film about a possessed bulldozer.
 The Hearse, a 1980 horror movie about a possessed hearse.
 Christine, a 1983 horror film inspired by Stephen King's novel of the same name about a possessed red 1958 Plymouth Fury.
 Nightmares, a 1983 movie made up of four separate story segments; the third, "The Benediction", features a traveling priest attacked on the highway by a demonic 4x4.
 Maximum Overdrive, a 1986 horror movie, based on the short story "Trucks" by Stephen King (and directed by King).
 Trucks, a more faithful 1997 made-for-TV film based on the King short story.
 Wheels of Terror, a 1990 made-for-TV film about a mysterious car with an unseen driver terrorizing a small Arizona community.
 Black Cadillac, a 2003 film about a mysterious black Cadillac that stalks three young men as they make their way through the virtually deserted mountain roads of Wisconsin.
Phantom Racer, a 2009 made-for-TV Syfy film about a race car possessed by the spirit of its driver seeking revenge against his former rival.
 Super Hybrid, a 2011 film about a shapeshifting monster that transforms into cars.
 "The Honking", a Futurama episode where Bender transforms into a similar-looking demonic car.

References

External links
 
 
 
 
 John Landis on The Car Trailers from Hell

1977 films
1977 horror films
1970s mystery films
1970s thriller films
American supernatural horror films
American supernatural thriller films
American mystery films
American road movies
Fictional cars
Films scored by Leonard Rosenman
Films about automobiles
Films based on urban legends
Films directed by Elliot Silverstein
Films shot in Utah
Universal Pictures films
1970s English-language films
1970s American films